Leslie Bulcock (5 January 1913 – 24 April 2001) was an English cricketer. He was a right-handed batsman and a right-arm off-break bowler who played for Lancashire. He was born and died in Colne, Lancashire.

Bulcock made a single first-class appearance in 1946, having played Lancashire League cricket since 1932 for his local team. He also played in the Minor Counties Championship during 1946. Bulcock finished nineteen years-worth of service for Colne in 1951.

References

1913 births
2001 deaths
English cricketers
Lancashire cricketers
People from Colne